Pixley ka Isaka Seme (c. 1881 – June 1951) was a South African lawyer and a founder and President of the African National Congress.

Early life
Seme was born the fourth son of Sinono Kuwana Seme in Durban, in what was then called the Colony of Natal, at the Inanda mission station of the American Zulu Mission of the American Board of Commissioners for Foreign Missions. He graduated from Mount Hermon School, MA, in 1902 (now the Northfield Mount Hermon School). He attended Adams College which was part of the mission.

His mother was a sister of John Langalibalele Dube, and descended from a local chief. At 17 years of age Seme left to study in the U.S., first at the Mount Hermon School and then Columbia University. In 1906, his senior year at University, he was awarded the Curtis Medal, Columbia's highest oratorical honor.  He subsequently decided to become an attorney. In October 1906 he was admitted to the University of Oxford to read for the degree of Bachelor of Civil Law; while at Oxford he was a member of Jesus College. He was admitted to the Middle Temple on 12 February 1907 and was Called to the Bar on 8 June 1910.

Seme returned to South Africa in 1910, and began to practice as a lawyer in Johannesburg.

Politics 
In 1911, Seme established the South African Native Farmers Association in order to encourage farm workers to buy land in the Daggakraal area, and thus attain personal independence. This led the white government to enact the Natives Land Act of 1913, barring "black" people from owning land in South Africa.

In response to the formation of the Union of South Africa, Seme worked with several other young African leaders recently returned from university studies in England, Richard Msimang, George Montsioa and Alfred Mangena, and with established leaders of the South African Native Convention in Johannesburg to promote the formation of a national organization that would unify various African groups from the separate colonies. In January 1912, these efforts bore fruit with the founding meeting of the South African Native National Congress, later renamed the African National Congress.

Seme was also the lawyer of Queen Regent Labotsibeni of Swaziland, through whom the first ANC newspaper Abantu-Batho was financed. Later, in 1922, Seme accompanied King Sobhuza II as part of a delegation to London to meet British authorities and the King regarding the land proclamation in Swaziland.

Seme's nationalist organizing among Africans paralleled the contemporaneous efforts of Mohandas Gandhi with South African Indians.

Personal life 
Seme was very close to the Zulu and Swazi royal families. This is primarily symbolized by his marriage to Phikisele Harriet ka Dinizulu, the daughter of the then Zulu king,  King Dinuzulu, and to Lozinja, daughter of Swazi King Mbandzeni.

Notes

References
Bryant, A. T. ([1929] 1965).  Olden Times in Zululand and Natal.  Cape Town: C. Struik
Smith, Edwin W. (1952). The Life and Times of Daniel Lindley, Missionary to the Zulus, Pastor of the Voortrekkers, Ubebe Omhlope.  New York: Library Publishers. The man who founded the ANC.

External links
Seme. ANC Biography.
"Native Union". Article by Seme, in Imvo Zabantsundu, 24 October 1911.
"Formation of the African National Congress, 1912". Compiled by the Federal Research Division of the Library of Congress.

1881 births
1951 deaths
People from Pixley ka Seme Local Municipality
Zulu people
Members of the African National Congress
History of South Africa
South African activists
Alumni of Jesus College, Oxford
Presidents of the African National Congress
Political party founders
Northfield Mount Hermon School alumni
20th-century South African lawyers
Members of the Order of Luthuli
Columbia College (New York) alumni